Horsham is a village in Worcestershire, England. Remains of an old Iron Age fort are located within the village.

External links

Villages in Worcestershire